The 2017–18 season was Torino Football Club's 107th season of competitive football, 90th season in the top division of Italian football and 73rd season in Serie A. The club competed in Serie A and in the Coppa Italia.

The season was Serbian coach Siniša Mihajlović's second at the club; however, following a first half of the season in which Torino drew ten and won only five matches in Serie A, he was sacked on 4 January 2018. Former Napoli and Inter coach Walter Mazzarri was appointed to be Mihajlović's replacement the same day.

In Serie A Torino repeated last season's 9th place finish; they were eliminated in the Coppa Italia quarter-finals by city rivals and eventual winners Juventus.

Players

Squad information
Last updated on 20 May 2018
Appearances include league matches only

Transfers

In

Loans in

Out

Loans out

Pre-season and friendlies

Competitions

Serie A

League table

Results summary

Results by round

Matches

Coppa Italia

Statistics

Appearances and goals

|-
! colspan=14 style=background:#dcdcdc; text-align:center| Goalkeepers

|-
! colspan=14 style=background:#dcdcdc; text-align:center| Defenders

|-
! colspan=14 style=background:#dcdcdc; text-align:center| Midfielders

|-
! colspan=14 style=background:#dcdcdc; text-align:center| Forwards

|-
! colspan=14 style=background:#dcdcdc; text-align:center| Players transferred out during the season

Goalscorers

Last updated: 20 May 2018

Clean sheets

Last updated: 20 May 2018

Disciplinary record

Last updated: 20 May 2018

References

Torino F.C. seasons
Torino